The Wisconsin Department of Military Affairs is the military arm of the State of Wisconsin. It oversees the Wisconsin Army National Guard, the Wisconsin Air National Guard, the Wisconsin Emergency Management, and, when organized, the Wisconsin State Defense Force. Its commander-in-chief is Wisconsin Governor Tony Evers and its adjutant general is Major General Paul E. Knapp.

References

External links 
Wisconsin Department of Military Affairs

Military in Wisconsin
Government of Wisconsin